is a dam in Kusu, Ōita Prefecture, Japan, and it was completed in 1969.  The rock-fill dam is characterized by radial gates of the gate 3, which supplies water for agriculture and farmland.

Immediately downstream from the dam are the Nishishiiya Falls which are one of Japan's Top 100 Waterfalls.

References

Dams in Ōita Prefecture
Dams completed in 1969